The TCV hairpin 5 (H5) is an RNA element found in the turnip crinkle virus. This RNA element is composed of a stem-loop that contains a large symmetrical internal loop (LSL). H5 can repress minus-strand synthesis when the 3' side of the LSL pairs with the 4 bases at the 3'-terminus of the RNA(GCCC-OH).

See also 
 Turnip crinkle virus (TCV) core promoter hairpin (Pr)

References

External links 
 

Cis-regulatory RNA elements
Tombusviridae